Roberto Oliveira Gonçalves do Carmo (born 22 June 1960), known as Robertinho, is a Brazilian football manager and former player who manages Simba. As a player, Robertinho played at both professional and international levels as a striker.

Career
Born in Rio de Janeiro, Robertinho played club football in Brazil, Portugal and Switzerland for Fluminense, Flamengo, Palmeiras, Internacional, Sport Recife, Atlético Mineiro, Nacional and Grössembacher.

He earned one international cap for Brazil on 25 September 1980, against Paraguay.

Robertinho became manager of Tunisian club Stade Tunisien for the second time in September 2007; he had previously coached Brazilian clubs Americano and Fluminense.

After time in Uganda with Vipers, in January he became manager of Tanzanian club Simba.

References

External links

1960 births
Living people
Footballers from Rio de Janeiro (city)
Brazilian footballers
Association football forwards
Brazil international footballers
Campeonato Brasileiro Série A players
Campeonato Brasileiro Série A managers
Kuwait Premier League managers
Fluminense FC players
CR Flamengo footballers
Sociedade Esportiva Palmeiras players
Sport Club Internacional players
Sport Club do Recife players
Botafogo de Futebol e Regatas players
Clube Atlético Mineiro players
C.D. Nacional players
Brazilian football managers
Rio Branco Esporte Clube managers
Grêmio Esportivo Brasil managers
Esporte Clube São Bento managers
Fluminense FC managers
Clube de Regatas Brasil managers
Centro Sportivo Alagoano managers
America Football Club (RJ) managers
Rio Branco Atlético Clube managers
Stade Tunisien managers
Kazma SC managers
Al-Shamal SC managers
ES Hammam-Sousse managers
Legião Futebol Clube managers
Stade Gabèsien managers
Grombalia Sports managers
Atlético Sport Aviação managers
Gor Mahia F.C. managers
Vipers SC managers
Simba S.C. managers
Brazilian expatriate football managers
Brazilian expatriate sportspeople in Tunisia
Expatriate football managers in Tunisia
Brazilian expatriate sportspeople in Kuwait
Expatriate football managers in Kuwait
Brazilian expatriate sportspeople in Qatar
Expatriate football managers in Qatar
Brazilian expatriate sportspeople in Angola
Expatriate football managers in Angola
Brazilian expatriate sportspeople in Rwanda
Expatriate football managers in Rwanda
Brazilian expatriates in Kenya
Expatriate football managers in Kenya
Brazilian expatriate sportspeople in Uganda
Expatriate football managers in Uganda
Brazilian expatriate sportspeople in Tanzania
Expatriate football managers in Tanzania